Florin Gheorghiu (born 6 April 1944) is a Romanian chess player and has been a university lecturer in foreign languages.

Born in Ploiești, on 6 April 1944, while the American bombers attacked the country's capital, his prodigious talent for the game was evidenced by his many early achievements; he became an International Master in 1963 and Romania's first Grandmaster just two years later.  

He earned the title of World Junior Champion in 1963, at Vrnjacka Banja, and has been the national champion of Romania on nine occasions.

Gheorghiu was a lecturer in French at the University of Bucharest and he also speaks English, Russian, German, and Spanish.

Chess career
When playing at his peak on the international tournament circuit, he was many times a winner. His victories included: Hastings 1967–68 (with Hort and Stein), Reykjavik 1972 (with Hort and Ólafsson), Orense 1973, Torremolinos 1974 (with Torre), Lone Pine 1979 (with Gligorić, Liberzon, and Hort), Novi Sad 1979, Biel 1982 (with Nunn) and Lenk 1990. He was always a formidable opponent at the U.S. Open tournament and finished first in three successive years—1979, 1980 (with Fedorowicz) and 1981 (with Christiansen and three others).

In his home country, there were few who could rival his dominance of the 1960s, 1970s, and 1980s. He won the Romanian Championship nine times (1960, 1962, 1964, 1965, 1966, 1967, 1973, 1977 and 1987). In 1970 he was equal first with Victor Ciocâltea, and after a subsequent tie-break match (5-5) the latter was awarded the champion title.

Despite these successes, Gheorghiu has seldom been regarded a serious contender for the world chess championship title. Although he regularly participated in the cycle and at other prestigious events, his placings at four Interzonal Tournaments (world championship qualifiers) confirmed that he was not as strong as the world's elite players at the time, but could nevertheless perform consistently well at a high level. At Petrópolis 1973 he finished 14th, at Manila 1976 10–13th, Riga 1979 5–6th, and at Moscow 1982, he came 12th. At the Riga Interzonal, he only narrowly failed to qualify for the Candidates Matches. Overall, he participated in nine Zonal and four Interzonal tournaments.

Playing for Romania in team competitions, he amassed 459 games in 64 contests (including friendly matches with other nations), summing up to an overall result of 145 wins, 272 draws, and 42 losses. This included playing in every Chess Olympiad between 1962 and 1990, usually on first board. Further details are given in the table below.

Gheorghiu is renowned for his success against the reputedly solid Nimzo-Indian Defence. The variation comprising an early f3 for White (which is allied to the Sämisch Variation) became his trademark weapon, improving on the games and development work of Lajos Portisch and Gyozo Forintos before him. The system is now referred to as the Gheorghiu Variation in many chess opening manuals and has been employed by tactical experts such as Alexei Shirov.

Notable games

Here is how Gheorghiu, playing White, beat future world champion Bobby Fischer at the Havana Olympiad in 1966. This was the only competitive game that Fischer ever lost to a player younger than himself.
1.d4 Nf6 2.c4 e6 3.Nc3 Bb4 4.f3 d5 5.a3 Bxc3+ 6.bxc3 0-0 7.cxd5 exd5 8.e3 Nh5 9.Qc2 Re8 10.g4 Nf4 11.h4 c5 12.Kf2 Ng6 13.Bd3 Nc6 14.Ne2 Be6 15.g5 Rc8 16.h5 Nf8 17.g6 fxg6 18.hxg6 h6 19.Qb1 Na5 20.Nf4 c4 21.Bc2 Rc6 22.Ra2 Nd7 23.a4 Nf6 24.Ba3 Qd7 25.Rb2 b6 26.Rb5 Nb7 27.e4 dxe4 28.Bxe4 Rcc8 29.Re5 Bg4 30.Nd5 Rxe5 31.Nxf6+ gxf6 32.dxe5 Nc5 33.Bxc5 Qd2+ 34.Kg3 Bxf3 35.Bxf3 Rxc5 36.Qc1 Qxc1 37.Rxc1 Rxe5 38.Kf4 Kg7 39.Be4 h5 40.Rd1 Re7 41.Rd5 Kh6 42.Rd6 Kg7 43.Rc6 h4 44.Rxc4 h3 45.Kg3 Kh6 46.Bb1 Re3+ 47.Kh2 Re1 48.Bd3 Re3 49.Rh4+ Kg5 50.g7

Notes

References

External links 

 
 
 

1944 births
Living people
Chess grandmasters
Chess Olympiad competitors
Chess players from Bucharest
World Junior Chess Champions
People from Ploiești